When Jonathan Died is a novel by Tony Duvert, translated by D.R. Roberts.  It was first published in France as Quand Mourut Jonathan in 1978.

Plot summary
Jonathan is a 27-year-old artist living in Paris who befriends a single mother and her six-year-old son, Serge. When Serge is eight, his mother asks Jonathan to look after him for a week, which they spend together at Jonathan's country house in southern France.

Jonathan and Serge become close friends. Jonathan, smitten with the boy, is distraught when Serge returns to Paris. They meet each other again when Serge is age 10, and their sexual relationship continues. While Jonathan and Serge are separated, the sexual side of Jonathan's desires begins to dominate his behaviour. He eventually seeks out other young boys; he is rejected by some and finds no real satisfaction in sex with the others.

Serge, fatherless and miserable at home with his aloof and demeaning mother, decides to run away to be with Jonathan. He sets off to find him, but becomes overwhelmed by hopelessness, and when confronted with a busy road to cross at night, commits suicide by throwing himself under a fast-moving car.

1978 French novels
Novels about artists
Novels set in Paris
Novels about ephebophilia
Novels about child sexual abuse